Charles Edward Conder (24 October 1868 – 9 February 1909) was an English-born painter, lithographer and designer. He emigrated to Australia and was a key figure in the Heidelberg School, arguably the beginning of a distinctively Australian tradition in Western art.

Early life

Conder was born in Tottenham, Middlesex, the second son, of six children, of James Conder, civil engineer and Mary Ann Ayres. He spent several years as a young child in India until the death of his mother (aged 31 years) on 14 May 1873 in Bombay, when Charles was four; he was then sent back to England and attended a number of schools including a boarding school at Eastbourne, which he attended from 1877. He left school at 15, and his very religious, non-artistic father, against Charles's natural artistic inclinations, decided that he should follow in his footsteps as a civil engineer.

In 1884, at the age of 16, he was sent to Sydney, Australia, where he worked for his uncle, a land surveyor for the New South Wales government. However he disliked the work, much preferring to draw the landscape rather than survey it. In 1886, he left the job and became an artist for the "Illustrated Sydney News", where he was in the company of other artists such as Albert Henry Fullwood, Frank Mahony and Benjamin Edwin Minns. He also attended the painting classes of Alfred James Daplyn and had joined the Art Society of New South Wales.

Career
 

In 1888, Conder moved to Melbourne where he met other Australian artists including Arthur Streeton, and shared a studio with Tom Roberts, whom he had previously met in Sydney. Short of cash, the attractive Conder apparently paid off his landlady by sexual means, catching syphilis in the process, which was to plague the later years of his life.  During his two years in Melbourne, Conder worked with the other members of the school and produced a number of famous works, including Under The Southern Sun. This painting clearly shows the burning sunlight and desolation that can be inflicted by an Australian drought.

In 1890, he moved to Paris and studied at the Académie Julian, where he befriended several avant-garde artists.

In Sydney and later Melbourne Conder associated with G. P. Nerli, an itinerant Italian painter and the bearer of new European influences who has been credited with shaping Conder's development. The extent of the influence has been debated, but the fact of it is undeniable. Like Conder, Nerli was a bon-vivant whose appreciation of the 'dam fine' 'Melbourne girls' survives in a letter to a mutual friend, Percy Spence.

Regarded as his greatest Sydney painting, Departure of the Orient – Circular Quay (1888) was the culmination of Conder's new mastery of form and brushwork. Painted from the vantage point of an upstairs room at the First and Last Hotel, overlooking the bustling harbour and ferry berths at Circular Quay in Sydney Cove, this work depicts the dockside scene at the moment when the 'Orient' has cast off for her voyage to England. The theme of lively urban streetscapes and rainy atmospheric conditions was one that derived originally from Japanese art and informed the work of the American-born James Abbott McNeill Whistler, who in turn inspired a generation of international artists conversant with the principles of French Impressionism.
Following successful sale of this work to the Art Gallery of New South Wales, Conder departed for Melbourne in October 1888 to join Roberts and the circle of painters working there. He returned to Europe in 1890, where he became fully involved with Aestheticism and mixed with leading artists and writers of the day including Henri Toulouse-Lautrec, Oscar Wilde and Aubrey Beardsley.

Conder was a fun-loving man who painted with an often humorous touch. While staying with Tom Roberts in his famous Grosvenor chambers studio, he painted A holiday at Mentone (1888), which shows men and women at the beach relaxing while clothed from head to foot–the men in suits and hats; the ladies in long, girdled dresses with boots and pretty hats. The man and woman at the front of the painting face away from each other, yet possibly are interested in each other, each watching the other from the corner of their eye. The mood is one of simple elegance and with a relaxed feel, as in the background people are strolling along the beach into the distance. The composition of the painting has possibly been borrowed from a work by Whistler in which a bridge similarly transects the picture. Conder among other painters such as Frederick McCubbin had been directly or indirectly influenced by Whistler.

Europe

Conder left Australia in 1890, and spent the rest of his life in Europe, mainly Britain, but visiting France on many occasions.  His art was better received in Britain than in Paris.  In 1892, Henri de Toulouse-Lautrec painted his portrait, this sketch is owned by the Aberdeen Art Gallery.

In 1895, Conder came to Dieppe, attempting to socialise among the artistic community and the English families with their attractive daughters, as described by Simona Pakenham in her study of the English people there in the century before World War I. His friends remembered him as " a sick man, unable to face reality". In spite of drunken spells and disreputable company, Conder's powers as an artist were then at their height. He made a specialty of painting on silk, relatively easy on silk fans, but he excelled on one occasion when he painted a series of white silk gowns worn by Alexandra Thaulow, wife of Norwegian painter Frits Thaulow, while she stood on a table, the gowns becoming "coloured like a field of flowers". He met Aubrey Beardsley in Dieppe, but they did not like each other. He continued to paint, but his output was severely affected by the continual poor health, including paralysis and a bout of delirium tremens.

He married a wealthy widow, Stella Maris Belford (née MacAdams) at The British Embassy Paris on 5 December 1901, giving him financial security.  His later works are not nearly as well regarded critically as his earlier Australian paintings.

Later life and death
He spent the last year of his life in a sanatorium, and died in Holloway Sanatorium of "general paresis of the insane", in modern terms tertiary syphilis. In death, Conder's work was rated highly by many notable artists, such as Pissarro and Degas.

The Canberra suburb of Conder, established in 1991, was named after him. Satirist Barry Humphries is a major aficionado and collector of the artist, and at one time had the world's largest private collection of Conder's work.

See also
Australian art

References

Bibliography
Galbally, Ann. Charles Conder: the last bohemian, Miegunyah Press: Melbourne University (2002) Catalogue reference and book summary
Gibson, Frank & Dodgson, Campbell. Charles Conder; his life and work (London: John Lane, 1914).
Pakenham, Simona. Sixty Miles from England: The English at Dieppe 1814-1914, (London, Macmillan, 1967).
Rothenstein, John. The Life and Death of Conder, (London: J.M. Dent & Sons, 1938; New York: E.P. Dutton, c.1938).

Art Gallery of New South Wales: highlights from the collection (2008), Edmund Capon (England; Australia, b.1940) (Author), Art Gallery of New South Wales (Australia, estab. 1874), Sydney, New South Wales, Australia.
'K' is for Conder: Charles Conder retrospective (2003), Public Programmes Department, Art Gallery of New South Wales (Australia) (Author), Art Gallery of New South Wales (Australia, estab. 1874), Domain, Sydney, New South Wales, Australia.
Charles Conder 1868–1909 (2003), Ann Galbally (Australia) (Author), Barry Pearce (Australia) (Author), Barry Humphries (Australia, b.1934) (Author), Art Gallery of New South Wales (Australia, estab. 1874), Domain, Sydney, New South Wales, Australia.
Australian art: in the Art Gallery of New South Wales (2000), Barry Pearce (Australia) (Author), Art Gallery of New South Wales (Australia, estab. 1874), Domain, Sydney, New South Wales, Australia.
Art Gallery of New South Wales Handbook (1999), Bruce James (Australia) (Author), Edmund Capon (England; Australia, b.1940) (Director), Trustees of the Art Gallery of New South Wales (Australia), Domain, Sydney, New South Wales, Australia.
The Art Gallery of New South Wales collections (1994), Ewen McDonald (Australia) (Editor), Art Gallery of New South Wales (Australia, estab. 1874), Sydney, New South Wales, Australia.
Art Gallery of New South Wales Handbook (1988), Annabel Davie (Editor), Trustees of the Art Gallery of New South Wales (Australia), Domain, Sydney, New South Wales, Australia.
The Artist & the City (1983), Brian Ladd (Australia) (Author), Alan Krell (Author), Art Gallery of New South Wales (Australia, estab. 1874), Domain, Sydney, New South Wales, Australia.
Art Gallery of New South Wales picturebook (1972), Editor Unknown (Editor), Trustees of the Art Gallery of New South Wales (Australia), Domain, Sydney, New South Wales, Australia.
Charles Conder: 1868–1909 (1966), Dr Ursula Hoff (England; Australia, b.1909, d.2005) (Author), Art Gallery of New South Wales (Australia, estab. 1874), Sydney, New South Wales, Australia.
Art Gallery of New South Wales Quarterly (Jan 1960), Hal Missingham (Australia, b.1906, d.1994) (Editor), Art Gallery of New South Wales (Australia, estab. 1874), Sydney, New South Wales, Australia.
A catalogue of Australian oil paintings in the National Art Gallery of New South Wales 1875–1952 (1953), Bernard Smith (Australia, b.1916, d.2011) (Author), Art Gallery of New South Wales (Australia, estab. 1874), Sydney, New South Wales, Australia.
A retrospective exhibition of Australian painting (1953), Hal Missingham (Australia, b.1906, d.1994) (Author), National Art Gallery of New South Wales (Australia, estab. 1874), Domain, Sydney, New South Wales, Australia.
100 years of Australian painting (1948), Bernard Smith (Australia, b.1916, d.2011) (Author), National Art Gallery of New South Wales (Australia, estab. 1874), Sydney, New South Wales, Australia.
150 years of Australian art (1938), Lionel Lindsay (Australia, b.1874, d.1961) (Author), Trustees of the National Art Gallery of New South Wales (Australia), Sydney, New South Wales, Australia.
Fifty years of Australian art 1879–1929 (1929), George Galway (Australia) (Author), Royal Art Society of New South Wales Press (Australia), New South Wales, Australia.
Elwyn Lynn (author) Charles Conder The Australian Landscape and its Artists, Bay Books 1977 pp 60–65

External links

 Charles Conder at the Art Gallery of New South Wales
 Charles Conder – Short Biography at Yellow Nineties Online
Charles Conder online (ArtCyclopedia)
 "Artist's footsteps", source of most material for this article
 Charles Conder on Picture Australia
 Conder collection, National Gallery of Victoria
An early taste for literature 1888 – Ballarat Fine Art Gallery.
Review of Conder exhibition ("Nineteenth-century Art Worldwide" on-line magazine)

1868 births
1909 deaths
Académie Julian alumni
Heidelberg School
People from Tottenham
Deaths in mental institutions
Deaths from syphilis
19th-century Australian painters
19th-century Australian male artists
Symbolist painters
Australian landscape painters
Australian male painters
Infectious disease deaths in England
English emigrants to colonial Australia